Cameron Douglas Mann (born April 20, 1977) is a Canadian former professional ice hockey Winger who played in the National Hockey League (NHL) with the Boston Bruins and Nashville Predators. He finished his career with the EIHL's Nottingham Panthers, initially signing with the team on July 22, 2009.

Playing career 
An alumnus of the Red Lake District Minor Hockey Association and the Peterborough Petes of the OHL, Mann was  drafted 99th overall by the Boston Bruins in the 1995 NHL Entry Draft and appeared in 90 NHL games with the Bruins over four seasons. He was traded to the Dallas Stars in June 2001 for Richard Jackman but remained with their American Hockey League affiliate the Utah Grizzlies and never played for the Stars. He was then traded to the Nashville Predators in June 2002 for David Gosselin and a 5th round pick in the 2003 Draft. Mann went on to play just 4 games for the Predators.

In 2003, Mann moved on to the European League and signed with ERC Ingolstadt of the Deutsche Eishockey Liga and stayed for four seasons. He moved to Finland's SM-liiga in 2007 and signed with Ilves before returning to Germany in 2008, signed for Oberliga side Herver EV and then moved to EV Duisburg Die Füchse. For the 2009-2010 season Mann played in Nottingham for the Panthers winning a Challenge Cup and won team MVP honors.

Coaching career
Mann retired from professional hockey on April 7, 2010, announcing his retirement after the Panthers finished third in the 2009–10 EIHL playoffs. Since his retirement, Mann joined the OJHL's Peterborough Stars as an assistant coach. As of March 2012 the Peterborough Stars ceased operations, merging with the Lindsay Muskies and ending his association with the team.

Personal
Mann was born in Thompson, Manitoba but was raised in Balmertown, Ontario.

Career statistics

Regular season and playoffs

International

Awards and honours

References

External links

1977 births
Boston Bruins draft picks
Boston Bruins players
Canadian ice hockey right wingers
ERC Ingolstadt players
Füchse Duisburg players
Ice hockey people from Manitoba
Ice hockey people from Ontario
Ilves players
Living people
Milwaukee Admirals players
Nashville Predators players
Nottingham Panthers players
People from Red Lake, Ontario
People from Thompson, Manitoba
Peterborough Petes (ice hockey) players
Providence Bruins players
Utah Grizzlies (AHL) players
Canadian expatriate ice hockey players in England
Canadian expatriate ice hockey players in Finland
Canadian expatriate ice hockey players in Germany